Shellie McMillon, Jr. (March 11, 1936 – July 11, 1980) was an American professional basketball player. McMillon was selected in the 1958 NBA Draft by the Detroit Pistons after a collegiate career at Bradley University. He played for the Pistons and St. Louis Hawks during his four-year NBA career.

Although their surnames are spelled differently, McMillon was the older brother of Ernie McMillan, who played 15 seasons with the NFL's St. Louis Cardinals. Ernie's son Erik McMillan was a defensive back for the New York Jets.

Shellie McMillon was one of the stars of a DuSable High School team from Chicago that won back-to-back Chicago Public League championships and in 1954 became the first team with black players and a black coach to play in the Illinois state championship game.

References

1936 births
1980 deaths
American men's basketball players
Basketball players from Chicago
Bradley Braves men's basketball players
Detroit Pistons draft picks
Detroit Pistons players
Power forwards (basketball)
Small forwards
St. Louis Hawks players